Defending champion Andy Lapthorne and his partner David Wagner defeated the other defending champion Dylan Alcott and his partner Sam Schröder in the final, 6–1, 3–6, 6–4 to win the quad doubles wheelchair tennis title at the 2021 Wimbledon Championships. With the win, Wagner completed the career Super Slam.

Draw

Finals

References

Sources
WC Quad Doubles

Quad Wheelchair Doubles